Two Fables is a collection of two short stories by Roald Dahl, first published in 1986 by Viking in England and in 1987 by Farrar, Straus, & Giroux in the United States.

It contains the following two stories:

"Princess and the Poacher"
"Princess Mammalia"

1986 short story collections
Short story collections by Roald Dahl
Farrar, Straus and Giroux books